Central America consists of Belize, El Salvador, Guatemala, Honduras, Costa Rica, Panama, and Nicaragua. As of 2015, the tallest structure in Central America is the Trump Ocean Club in Panamá, a 2.4 million-square-foot, 65-story waterfront tower, 284 meters in height, co-developed by the Trump Organization and Panamanian resort developer K Group.

Historically most of the tallest building structures in Central America have been located in Guatemala City and San Salvador.
 This is due to the high development these countries had in the past compared to the rest of Central America. Nowadays, new countries, such as Honduras and Costa Rica, have been building the tallest buildings in the area, due to the high development the countries have in recent years. Panamá has emerged as a hotbed of skyscraper building activity and currently lists a total of 49 buildings over 150 meters in height and another 2 under construction.

List

See also
List of tallest buildings in Latin America

References
Centroamérica: torres más altas de este lado del mundo

Central America
Buildings, tallest
Tall